The Halifax transmitting station is a broadcasting and telecommunications facility which serves Halifax in Yorkshire, England, and is located on Southowram bank top overlooking the town from the East.

Most of Halifax viewers are able to receive Emley Moor and the relay is only used in the north, east and centre of the town which is blocked by the bank on which the relay resides. Further afield, the Halifax relay also covers Elland, parts of Brighouse and along the Calder Valley as far as Sowerby Bridge.

The Halifax transmitter is an A group relay with vertical polarisation and has been transmitting digital television signals since September 2011. It also transmits one analogue radio station and is used by the major mobile phone networks for their coverage of Halifax due to its location overlooking the entire town.

Transmitted services

Analogue radio (FM VHF)

Digital television

Analogue television
Analogue television was switched off during September 2011. BBC Two was closed on 7 September and ITV1 temporarily moved into its frequency to allow BBC A to launch on UHF 24. The remaining analogue signals closed on 21 September 2011 and were replaced by digital signals.

See also 
Emley Moor transmitting station

External links
Information and pictures of the Halifax relay
Switchover information for Halifax
Switchover information page

Buildings and structures in Halifax, West Yorkshire
Mass media in Yorkshire
Transmitter sites in England
Yorkshire Television